is the name of a set of Japanese mysteries (the first, being made in 1946), featuring a detective of the same name who could take on seven different faces, in similar fashion to the protagonists of later series 7-Color Mask, Rainbowman, and Cutie Honey. In the film series, Bannai was played by Chiezō Kataoka. He portrayed the character in eleven movies from 1946 until 1960, first for Daiei, then as a contract actor for Toei. After him, Akira Kobayashi portrayed the character in two other movies in 1978. Bannai Tarao is credited on several songs on Japanese rock pioneers Happy End's 1971 album Kazemachi Roman.

References

External links
七つの顔 on Amazon.co.jp
Review of the eighth film on nippon-kino.net (German)

Japanese mystery films